The 2020 Christian Democratic Appeal leadership election was called to elect the new leader and lead candidate (lijsttrekker) of the Christian Democratic Appeal (CDA) in the run-up to the 2021 Dutch general election.

Background 
The position of party leader of the CDA had been vacant since the appointment of incumbent party leader Sybrand van Haersma Buma as mayor of Leeuwarden in May 2019. The CDA has no formal procedure in place for selecting a replacement. Initially, the party had intended to promote its leader in the House of Representatives, Pieter Heerma, to the position of party leader, but Heerma declined this offer.

Speculation that either Hugo de Jonge or Wopke Hoekstra would be selected instead, prompted Mona Keijzer to demand the CDA to hold an internal referendum over who the new party leader should be. Keijzer had already participated in earlier leadership elections, which she lost to Sybrand Buma.

Some party prominents, including Hugo de Jonge, feared a leadership election could divide the party and advised the executive board to appoint a new leader instead. Nonetheless, the board decided to hold an election to choose the new party leader.

Five party members announced their candidacy for the party leadership: Hugo de Jonge, Mona Keijzer, Pieter Omtzigt, Martijn van Helvert, and André Reumkens. The candidacy of Reumkens was declined by the board. The first round of the election was held between 6 and 11 July 2020. A second round was held between 11 and 14 July 2020.

Candidates

Nominated 
The following CDA members announced their candidacy:

Eliminated

Withdrawn

Declined 
 André Reumkens, candidate 2018 municipal elections in Beekdaelen

Timeline

Opinion polls

Results

Aftermath 
Following his victory, Hugo de Jonge announced that he and Omtzigt would run as lead candidates for the 2021 Dutch general election together, calling Omtzigt his "running mate". Four months later, however, De Jonge found that the position of party leader was difficult to combine with his role as Minister of Health, Welfare and Sport, given the attention required of him during the COVID-19 pandemic. On 12 November 2020, he resigned from his position as party leader. The day after, the party's executive board announced that it had chosen Wopke Hoekstra as the new party leader, despite the fact that Hoekstra did not participate in the leadership election.

Pieter Omtzigt claimed that party chair Rutger Ploum had promised him that he would be allowed to take De Jonge's place in the event of the latter's resignation, and expressed his dissatisfaction with Hoekstra's appointment. Omtzigt temporarily resigned from campaigning in February 2021, a month before the general election. Initially, he cited being overworked, but in March 2021, it came to light that he was being harassed by CDA prominents for his investigations into the Dutch childcare benefits scandal and his critical stance in the leadership election. On 12 June 2021, Omtzigt confirmed the rumours that he was being harassed and split from the CDA to continue as an independent Member of Parliament.

References 

Christian Democratic Appeal
Christian Democratic Appeal
Political party leadership elections in the Netherlands
Christian Democratic Appeal leadership election
July 2020 events in the Netherlands